Calon Sarjana ( Bachelor's Candidate) is an Indonesian YouTube channel associated with the Infia network.

At the time of its closure, the channel had over 13 million subscribers. In the years 2019–20, after the channel copied a video by British YouTuber JT, he found out that the channel was stealing videos from numerous other major channels, and eventually got the channel terminated on copyright grounds.

On 22 January 2020, Calon Sarjana's account was removed by YouTube due to several claims of copyright infringement. As a substitute for Calon Sarjana, the manager from the channel uses Calon Ilmuwan instead of Calon Sarjana.

References

Indonesian YouTubers
YouTube controversies
YouTube channels launched in 2016